From Moscow to Mars is a retrospective box set from Erasure, released in the UK by Mute Records on 9 December 2016. The set commemorates the 30th anniversary of the group's founding, and contains an assortment of previously released and never before released material. Its name is derived from a lyric found within the group's single "Star", "We go waiting for the stars to come showering down... From Moscow to Mars...Universe falling down". The 22 remixes, 19 rarities and 17 live recordings included in the box set were released on digital platforms worldwide on 10 May 2019.

Contents
The box set contains 12 audio CDs, one DVD, an exclusive photobook, photographs, a postcard set and a "space passport". Three of the CDs contain the group's singles in chronological order. Two contain personal selections, one each from Vince and Andy, of their favourite tracks, and are a selection of singles and album tracks. Two contain a selection of most of their B-sides, as selected by members of the official Fan Club, the "Erasure Information Service". Two contain a selection of remixes, some previously released and some specially commissioned for this release. One contains a selection of live performances, one has a selection of demos and unreleased tracks, and the final CD contains an "audio documentary" entitled "A Little Respect – 30 Years of Erasure". The final disc is a region-free NTSC DVD of the Wild! concert recording previously issued on VHS and Laserdisc, available here on DVD for the first time.

Release
From Moscow to Mars was originally scheduled to be released in mid-November 2016, and was made available for pre-order from Lexer Music and Pledge Music on 2 September 2016. Those who pre-ordered also received six digital download tracks which do not otherwise appear in the box set. The box set was eventually released on 9 December 2016.

A pre-release party was arranged in Birmingham on 4 November 2016 running between 2:30pm and 11:30pm

Reception

The first pre-release reviews appeared during the second week of November 2016 and were very positive.

Track listing

DVD - The Wild! Tour
Released for the first time on DVD, this recording of Erasure's Wild! tour filmed in London in 1989 has previously only been available on VHS. It includes unreleased backstage footage. NTSC, region 0

Preorder bonus
Those who pre-ordered the box set also received a digital download of the following tracks:

 "Dreamlike State" (7" Alternative Mix)
 "Sugar Hill" (Vox Mix)
 "Heart of Stone" (Live)
 "Then I Go Twisting" (Demo)
 "Fingers & Thumbs" (Electrofinger Dub)
 "Sacred" (Chris Cox Dub Mix)

References

 http://www.pledgemusic.com/projects/from-moscow-to-mars/updates/73615
 https://web.archive.org/web/20160907044642/http://www.lexermusic.com/erasure-30/erasure-30-from-moscow-to-mars-an-erasure-anthology-super-deluxe-boxset

External links
 Official site

Erasure compilation albums
2016 compilation albums
Mute Records compilation albums